KBLU may refer to:

 KBLU (AM), a radio station (560 AM) licensed to serve Yuma, Arizona, United States
 KBLU-FM, a radio station (90.5 FM) licensed to serve Pilot Rock, Oregon, United States
 KBLU-LP, a low-power radio station (92.3 FM) licensed to serve Logan, Utah, United States
 Blue Canyon–Nyack Airport (ICAO code KBLU)